Cresson is a city located at the corners of Hood, Johnson, and Parker counties in the U.S. state of Texas. Incorporated in 2001, Cresson had a population of 741 at the 2010 census.

History

The origin of the name has been lost to history. One book suggests the city may have been named after John Cresson, captain of a wagon train that camped in the area before the Civil War. A similar story is told that Cresson was named for an official with the Fort Worth and Rio Grande Railroad.

Cresson was at one time served by the Fort Worth and Rio Grande, the Gulf, Colorado and Santa Fe and the Nancy Hanks railroad companies. It has also been suggested that Cresson was named for Cresson, Pennsylvania, another city with a strong railroading history.

Geography
Cresson is situated on the border between Hood and Johnson counties, with the city limits also extending north into Parker County. US 377 leads northeast  to Fort Worth and southwest  to Granbury, the Hood county seat. State Highway 171 leads northwest  to Weatherford, the Parker County seat, and southeast  to Cleburne, the Johnson County seat.  Owing to its location being between these four places makes Cresson an important contribution for fuel stops and an easy place to start (plus rise) a business that contributes to commuters.

Demographics

2020 census

As of the 2020 United States census, there were 1,349 people, 315 households, and 257 families residing in the city.

Education
The Granbury Independent School District, the Godley Independent School District, and Aledo Independent School District serve students in the area.

Most of Cresson in Hood County is in Granbury ISD, with a small portion in Godley ISD. In Johnson County Cresson is divided between Granbury and Godley ISDs. Most of Cresson in Parker County is in Granbury ISD, with a portion in Aledo ISD.

Gallery

Climate
The climate in this area is characterized by hot, humid summers and generally mild to cool winters.  According to the Köppen Climate Classification system, Cresson has a humid subtropical climate, abbreviated "Cfa" on climate maps.

References

External links
 
 

 

Cities in Texas
Cities in Hood County, Texas
Cities in Parker County, Texas
Cities in Johnson County, Texas
Dallas–Fort Worth metroplex 
Granbury micropolitan area
Populated places established in 2001
2001 establishments in Texas